Crystal structure prediction (CSP) is the calculation of the crystal structures of solids from first principles. Reliable methods of predicting the crystal structure of a compound, based only on its composition, has been a goal of the physical sciences since the 1950s. Computational methods employed include simulated annealing, evolutionary algorithms, distributed multipole analysis, random sampling, basin-hopping, data mining, density functional theory and molecular mechanics.

History
The crystal structures of simple ionic solids have long been rationalised in terms of Pauling's rules, first set out in 1929 by Linus Pauling. For metals and semiconductors one has different rules involving valence electron concentration. However, prediction and rationalization are rather different things. Most commonly, the term crystal structure prediction means a search for the minimum-energy arrangement of its constituent atoms (or, for molecular crystals, of its molecules) in space. The problem has two facets: combinatorics (the "search phase space", in practice most acute for inorganic crystals), and energetics (or "stability ranking", most acute for molecular organic crystals).
For complex non-molecular crystals (where the "search problem" is most acute), major recent advances have been the development of the Martonak version of metadynamics, the Oganov-Glass evolutionary algorithm USPEX, and first principles random search. The latter are capable of solving the global optimization problem with up to around a hundred degrees of freedom, while the approach of metadynamics is to reduce all structural variables to a handful of "slow" collective variables (which often works).

Molecular crystals
Predicting organic crystal structures is important in academic and industrial science, particularly for pharmaceuticals and pigments, where understanding polymorphism is beneficial. The crystal structures of molecular substances, particularly organic compounds, are very hard to predict and rank in order of stability. Intermolecular interactions are relatively weak and non-directional and long range. This results in typical lattice and free energy differences between polymorphs that are often only a few kJ/mol, very rarely exceeding 10 kJ/mol. Crystal structure prediction methods often locate many possible structures within this small energy range. These small energy differences are challenging to predict reliably without excessive computational effort.

Since 2007, significant progress has been made in the CSP of small organic molecules, with several different methods proving effective. The most widely discussed method first ranks the energies of all possible crystal structures using a customised MM force field, and finishes by using a dispersion-corrected DFT step to estimate the lattice energy and stability of each short-listed candidate structure. More recent efforts to predict crystal structures have focused on estimating crystal free energy by including the effects of temperature and entropy in organic crystals using vibrational analysis or molecular dynamics.

Crystal structure prediction software 
The following codes can predict stable and metastable structures given chemical composition and external conditions (pressure, temperature):
 AIRSS - Ab Initio Random Structure Searching based on stochastic sampling of configuration space and with the possibility to use symmetry, chemical, and physical constraints. Has been used to study bulk crystals, low-dimensional materials, clusters, point defects, and interfaces. Released under the GPL2 licence. Regularly updated.
 CALYPSO - The Crystal structure AnaLYsis by Particle Swarm Optimization, implementing the particle swarm optimization (PSO) algorithm to identify/determine the crystal structure. As with other codes, knowledge of the structure can be used to design multi-functional materials (e.g.,superconductive, thermoelectric, superhard, and energetic materials). Free for academic researchers. Regularly updated.
 GASP - predicts the structure and composition of stable and metastable phases of crystals, molecules, atomic clusters and defects from first-principles.  Can be interfaced to other energy codes including: VASP, LAMMPS, MOPAC, Gulp, JDFTx etc. Free to use and regularly updated.
 GRACE - for predicting molecular crystal structures, especially for the pharmaceutical industry. Based on dispersion-corrected density functional theory. Commercial software under active development.
GULP - Monte Carlo and genetic algorithms for atomic crystals.  GULP is based on classical force fields and works with many types of force fields. Free for academic researchers. Regularly updated.
 USPEX - multi-method software that includes evolutionary algorithms and other methods (random sampling, evolutionary metadynamics, improved PSO, variable-cell NEB method and transition path sampling method for phase transition mechanisms). Can be used for atomic and molecular crystals; bulk crystals, nanoparticles, polymers, surface reconstructions, interfaces; can optimize the energy or other physical properties. In addition to finding the structure for a given composition, can identify all stable compositions in a multicomponent variable-composition system and perform simultaneous optimisation of several properties. Free for academic researchers. Used by >4500 researchers. Regularly updated.
 XtalOpt - open source code implementing an evolutionary algorithm.

Further reading

References

Crystallography
Computational chemistry
Theoretical chemistry
Solid-state chemistry